Atula Thiri Maha Yaza Dewi (c. 1518–1568) was the chief queen consort of King Bayinnaung of Burma (Myanmar) from 1550 to 1568. The queen was of Toungoo royalty, daughter of King Mingyi Nyo and younger half-sister of King Tabinshwehti. She was the mother of King Nanda. Her 1534 marriage to Bayinnaung, a commoner, solidified an unfailing alliance between Tabinshwehti and Bayinnaung who together would go on to found the Toungoo Empire (or the Second Burmese Empire).

Early life
The future queen of Burma was born Princess Thakin Gyi in Toungoo (Taungoo) to King Mingyi Nyo and Khin Nwe, Princess of Mobye (Mong Pai). Commonly known as Khin Gyi, the princess was likely half-Shan, a product of the system of marriage alliances among the small kingdoms that dominated Burma at the time. Her maternal grandfather was the sawbwa (chief) of the Shan state of Mobye (present-day northern Kayah State), which was a tributary of the Shan state of Thibaw (Hsipaw). Indeed, Thibaw in turn was a tributary and the only reliable ally of Ava, whose authority Mingyi Nyo had spurned in 1510. (The princess was likely related to Hkonmaing of Thibaw and his son Narapati III of Mobye who became kings of Ava between 1542 and 1551.)

When she reached teenage, the princess became romantically involved with a commoner, one Ye Htut (later Bayinnaung), who was a close confidant and adviser of her brother the king. Circa April 1534, their affair was discovered, which under Burmese law constituted an act of treason. Some suggested to Ye Htut that he should mutiny. He refused and submitted to arrest, saying that although it was no crime to for a young man to love a young woman, it was an unpardonable crime for a soldier to break his oath of allegiance. Tabinshwehti deliberated at length with his ministers, and finally came to the conclusion that Ye Htut should be given his sister in marriage, and a princely title of Kyawhtin Nawrahta. With this decision, Tabinshwehti won the loyalty of his brother-in-law "without parallel in Burmese history". Ye Htut later received the title Bayinnaung (lit. "King's Elder Brother").

Chief queen
Atula Thiri bore Bayinnaung a daughter and a son, early in their marriage 1534–1535. She saw her husband only a few times a year as Bayinnaung and Tabinshwehti were always away on their military campaigns: Lower Burma (1534–1541), Prome and Pagan (1542–1545), Arakan (1545–1547), and Siam (1547–1549). Indeed, her only son Nanda, then only 12, went on the 1548–1549 Siamese campaign alongside his father and uncle.

Her accession as the chief queen of Burma was not a smooth one. When her brother the king was assassinated by one of his close advisers in April 1550, her husband was on a campaign to hunt down the rebels in the Irrawaddy delta. When she received the news by messenger at Pegu, she urgently forwarded the message to her husband on campaign at Dala (present-day Yangon). She immediately left Pegu, which had been taken over by rival claimants to the throne, with her two children for Dala.

Atula Thiri became the chief queen on 11 January 1551 when Bayinnaung was proclaimed king at his native city of Toungoo. At Bayinnaung's coronation ceremony on 12 January 1554 (Friday, 10th waxing of Tabodwe 915 ME), she sat alongside the king, taking the title of Agga Mahethi ("Chief Queen-Consort"). Next year, their only daughter, elder sister of Nanda, was married off to Thado Minsaw of Ava, the youngest half-brother of Bayinnaung, in the tradition of Burmese royalty. Also in 1555, Bayinnaung sent rich presents to the Temple of the Tooth at Kandy in Ceylon, and bought land there to keep lights continually burning at the shrine. The craftsmen he sent beautified the temple. He also sent brooms made out of his hair and Atula's to sweep the temple.

The queen died on 15 June 1568 (Tuesday, 7th waning of 1st Waso 930) at Pegu while her husband and her son were preparing for their next campaign in Siam. The Burmese chronicles uncharacteristically report that the king was extremely shaken and saddened by the death of his first love.

In popular culture 
She was portrayed as a character in Thai television drama many stories namely Phu Chana Sip Thit(Conqueror of the Ten Directions)(ผู้ชนะสิบทิศ) in the name Tala mae Chandra in The novel has been adapted as a television drama numerous times , including in 1958 Portrayed by darek satachan , 1971 Portrayed by Sahima sasiri, 1980 Portrayed by nantawan mekyai , 1983 Portrayed by dongjai hathaikan , 1989 Portrayed by natthaya dengBuhnga , and most recently 2013 Portrayed by Prisna kamphu siri.

Ancestry

See also

Notes

References

Bibliography
 
 
 

Chief queens consort of Toungoo dynasty
1568 deaths
Year of birth unknown
16th-century Burmese women
16th-century Buddhists